Teuila cards are a pack of fortune-telling cards, likely brought from Samoa by Isobel Strong, stepdaughter of Robert Louis Stevenson.

Both backs and fronts are coloured pictures, the back depicting a woman using the cards.

See also
 Tarot cards

References

Cartomancy